As an important port city, Chicago has operated dedicated fireboats since 1877.

In 1986, the Chicago Tribune offered a history of Chicago's larger fireboats, when the Chicago Fire Department moved the Victor L. Schlaeger from active to standby status.
According to that account, by 1908 the City was operating nine fireboats.  However that was when many of the buildings that lined the waterfront were still made of wood, and by 1986 most of the factories and warehouses by the waterfront were built of concrete.

Josiah Seymour Currey, in a history of Chicago published in 1912, listed five fireboats operating in the early 1900s.

By 1986 the city had introduced smaller, less powerful fireboats, that required smaller crews, and did not require specially trained and certified mariners to operate them.

When she was commissioned in 2010, the  Christopher Wheatley was Chicago's first full-size fireboat in sixty years.

References

 
Chicago Fire Department